Guelaât Bou Sbaâ is a town and commune in Guelma Province, Algeria.

References

Communes of Guelma Province